The following is chronology of the Orthodox Tewahedo Ethiopian and Eritrean Orthodox Churches from its base history to present.

Early history
 Biblical claims – According to the traditional claims, John Chrysostom speaks of the "Ethiopians present in Jerusalem" as being able to understand the preaching of Peter in Acts, 2:38.
 Early 4th century – Some Apostles reportedly took missions to Ethiopia. Socrates of Constantinople stated Ethiopia was one of region preached by Matthew the Apostle where a specific mention of "Ethiopia south of the Caspian Sea". 
 1st century – according to the New Testament book Act, 8:26–27, Christianity was entered to Ethiopia by means of Philip the Evangelist via baptism of the Ethiopian eunuch.
330 AD – Christianity is widely considered introduced by Syrian Greek named Frumentius after his voyage with his brother Aedesius to the Kingdom of Aksum. There, the two brothers were captured by the native Aksumite and brought to court forwarded to King Ezana, who was converted to Christian by influence of Frumentius.

Middle Ages
960 AD – Queen Gudit persecuted Axumite Christians during sacking the city. 
12th century – Communion with Coptic Orthodox Church of Alexandria. 
1439 – During the reign of Emperor Zara Yaqob, a religious discussion took place between Giyorgis and a French visitor led to the dispatch of an embassy from Ethiopia to the Vatican.
1507 – Mateus, an Armenian, had been sent as an Ethiopian envoy to Portugal.
1520 – an embassy under Dom Rodrigo de Lima landed in Ethiopia.

Early modern period
1622 – Conversion of Emperor Susenyos I to Roman Catholicism under the pressure of Jesuits.
1624 – Susenyos proclaimed the primacy of Rome and condemned local practices which included Saturday Sabbath and frequent fasts.
1632 – Emperor Fasilides restored the state administration to Orthodox Tewahedo after ten years conflict.
1633 – Fasilides expelled the Jesuits and in 1665, he ordered that all Jesuit books (the Book of the Franks) be burned.
1534 – Michael the Deacon, met with Martin Luther and affirmed the Augsburg Confession as a "good creed". In addition, Martin Luther stated that the Lutheran Mass agreed with that used by the Ethiopian Orthodox Church. As a result, the Lutheran churches extended fellowship with the Ethiopian Orthodox Church.
19th century – Publication of Amharic translation Bible began developing.

20th century
30 November 1942 – Emperor Haile Selassie ordered decree that allowed reforms on the Church with centralized financial funds.
13 July 1948 – the Coptic Orthodox Church agreed for autocephaly of the Ethiopian Orthodox Church.
14 January 1951 – the autocephaly was ended when Coptic Orthodox Pope Joseph II consecrated an Ethiopian-born Archbishop.
1959 – Abuna Basilios crowned as the first Patriarch of Ethiopia.
1974 – Disestablishment of the Church following the rise of the Derg and it's nationalized land policy.
1979 – Patriarch Theophilos was executed by the Derg.
1991 – Abdication of Abune Merkorios under the pressure of EPRDF.
1992 – Installation of Abune Paulos and creation of Exile Church.
28 September 1993 – Autocephaly of the Eritrean Orthodox Tewahedo Church formally approved by Coptic Patriarch Shenouda III.

21st century 
16 August 2012 – Death of Abune Paulos.
28 February 2013 – Abune Mathias from Agame province, elected as the 6th Patriarch of the Ethiopian Orthodox Church.
25 July 2018 – with assistance of Prime Minister Abiy Ahmed, delegation took place between Patriarchate in Addis Ababa and those from the United States exiled Churches and declared reunification in Washington, D.C. 
22 January 2023 – Abune Sawiros, Abune Ewostatewos and Abune Zena Markos designated 26-made Archbishops to overthrow the Holy Synod led by Patriarch Abune Mathias in Oromia Region diocese. The Holy Synod responded the ordination as "illegal" and excommunicated three archbishops on 26 January. On 31 January, the Prime Minister Abiy Ahmed convened a discussion on the matter, which he told he would ensure resolution for the conflict. His speech widely criticized by Holy Synod for lack of protection and also alleged involvement to the illegally formed Synod.

References

Christianity in Ethiopia
Christianity in Eritrea
Ethiopian Orthodox Tewahedo Church
Eritrean Orthodox Tewahedo Church